Monk's Dream is an album by Steve Lacy and Roswell Rudd released on the Verve label in 2000. It features performances by Lacy, Rudd, Jean-Jacques Avenel, John Betsch and Irene Aebi's vocals on two tracks.

Reception

The AllMusic review by William Ruhlmann awarded the album 4 stars, stating: "Monk's Dream is a warm reunion of old friends, but those friends could have tried a little harder to come up with something fresh."

The authors of The Penguin Guide to Jazz Recordings wrote: "The trombonist isn't the force of yore... even if the musical intelligence remains keen. Lacy himself is magnificent... Beautifully recorded."

In a review for Jazz Times, Duck Baker commented: "Rudd seems to be on fire these days, as if he's determined to make every note and nuance count, and Lacy sounds delighted to have such an inspired front-line partner. The masterful solos are full of surprise, humor, whimsy and courageous vulnerability, and the two-horn interplay could only be achieved by players with roots that go deep into the trad tradition."

C. Andrew Hovan of All About Jazz remarked: "Monk's Dream stands out as a solid entry in the discographies of both Lacy and Rudd... fans of both artists will come away with a better cognizance of two of the music's unrivaled individualists."

Writing for One Final Note, David Dupont stated: "The repertoire seems safe, and the playing sounds a little safe. Lacy's playing especially sounds like a distillation of his work, Rudd displays just how well his chops were getting back into shape and bassist Jean-Jacques Avenel and drummer John Betsch are simply one of the best rhythm duos in the music. They bring a well of color, and a deeply rooted sense of groove to everything they play."

Track listing 
 "Monk's Dream" (Monk) - 7:35
 "The Bath" - 11:43
 "The Rent" - 10:45
 "Pannonica" (Monk) - 9:26
 "A Bright Pearl" - 5:55
 "Traces" (text by Ryōkan) - 8:03
 "Koko" (Ellington) - 5:21
 "Grey Blue" - 10:08
 "The Door" - 7:05

All compositions by Steve Lacy except as indicated
 Recorded at Studios Ferber, Paris on June 21–22, 1999. Vocals recorded on August 12, 1999

Personnel 
 Steve Lacy - soprano saxophone
 Roswell Rudd - trombone
 Jean-Jacques Avenel - bass
 John Betsch - drums
 Irene Aebi (tracks 5 & 6) - vocals

References 

2000 albums
Steve Lacy (saxophonist) albums
Verve Records albums